Zürich (see below) is the largest city in Switzerland and the capital of the canton of Zürich. It is located in north-central Switzerland, at the northwestern tip of Lake Zürich. As of January 2023 the municipality has 443,037 inhabitants, the urban area 1.315 million (2009), and the Zürich metropolitan area 1.83 million (2011). Zürich is a hub for railways, roads, and air traffic. Both Zurich Airport and Zürich's main railway station are the largest and busiest in the country.

Permanently settled for over 2,000 years, Zürich was founded by the Romans, who called it . However, early settlements have been found dating back more than 6,400 years (although this only indicates human presence in the area and not the presence of a town that early). During the Middle Ages, Zürich gained the independent and privileged status of imperial immediacy and, in 1519, became a primary centre of the Protestant Reformation in Europe under the leadership of Huldrych Zwingli.

The official language of Zürich is German, but the main spoken language is Zürich German, the local variant of the Alemannic Swiss German dialect.

Many museums and art galleries can be found in the city, including the Swiss National Museum and Kunsthaus. Schauspielhaus Zürich is considered to be one of the most important theatres in the German-speaking world.

Zürich is home to many financial institutions and banking companies.

Name

The name is traditionally written in English as Zurich, without the umlaut.

The Latin stress on the long vowel of the Gaulish name, was lost in German  but is preserved in Italian  and in Romansh . The first development towards its later Germanic form is attested as early as the 6th century with the form Ziurichi. From the 9th century onward, the name is established in an Old High German form  (857 in villa Zurih, 924 in Zurich curtem, 1416 Zürich Stadt). In the early modern period, the name became associated with the name of the Tigurini, and the name  rather than the historical  is sometimes encountered in Modern Latin contexts.

History

Early history

Settlements of the Neolithic and Bronze Age were found around Lake Zürich. Traces of pre-Roman Celtic, La Tène settlements were discovered near the Lindenhof, a morainic hill dominating the SE - NW waterway constituted by Lake Zurich and the river Limmat. In Roman times, during the conquest of the alpine region in 15 BC, the Romans built a castellum on the Lindenhof. Later here was erected Turicum (a toponym of clear Celtic origin), a tax-collecting point for goods trafficked on the Limmat, which constituted part of the border between Gallia Belgica (from AD 90 Germania Superior) and Raetia: this customs point developed later into a vicus. After Emperor Constantine's reforms in AD 318, the border between Gaul and Italy (two of the four praetorian prefectures of the Roman Empire) was located east of Turicum, crossing the river Linth between Lake Walen and Lake Zürich, where a castle and garrison looked over Turicum's safety.

In the 5th century, the Germanic Alemanni tribe settled in the Swiss Plateau. The Roman castle remained standing until the 7th century. A Carolingian castle, built on the site of the Roman castle by the grandson of Charlemagne, Louis the German, is mentioned in 835 (in castro Turicino iuxta fluvium Lindemaci). Louis also founded the Fraumünster abbey in 853 for his daughter Hildegard. He endowed the Benedictine convent with the lands of Zürich, Uri, and the Albis forest, and granted the convent immunity, placing it under his direct authority. In 1045, King Henry III granted the convent the right to hold markets, collect tolls, and mint coins, and thus effectively made the abbess the ruler of the city.

Zürich gained Imperial immediacy (becoming an Imperial free city) in 1218 with the extinction of the main line of the Zähringer family and attained a status comparable to statehood. During the 1230s, a city wall was built, enclosing 38 hectares, when the earliest stone houses on the Rennweg were built as well. The Carolingian castle was used as a quarry, as it had started to fall into ruin.

The abbess nominated the mayor, and she frequently delegated the minting of coins to citizens of the city.

An important event in the early 14th century was the completion of the Manesse Codex, a key source of medieval German poetry. The famous illuminated manuscript – described as "the most beautifully illumined German manuscript in centuries;" – was commissioned by the Manesse family of Zürich, copied and illustrated in the city at some time between 1304 and 1340. Producing such a work was a highly expensive prestige project, requiring several years work by highly skilled scribes and miniature painters, and it clearly testifies to the increasing wealth and pride of Zürich citizens in this period. The work contains 6 songs by Süsskind von Trimberg, who may have been a Jew, since the work itself contains reflections on medieval Jewish life, though little is known about him.

The first mention of Jews in Zürich was in 1273. Sources show that there was a synagogue in Zürich in the 13th century, implying the existence of a Jewish community. With the rise of the Black Death in 1349, Zürich, like most other Swiss cities, responded by persecuting and burning the local Jews, marking the end of the first Jewish community there. The second Jewish community of Zürich, formed towards the end of the 14th century, was short-lived, and Jews were expulsed and banned from the city from 1423 until the 19th century.

Archaeological findings 
A woman who died in about 200 BC was found buried in a carved tree trunk during a construction project at the Kern school complex in March 2017 in Aussersihl. Archaeologists revealed that she was approximately 40 years old when she died and likely carried out little physical labor when she was alive. A sheepskin coat, a belt chain, a fancy wool dress, a scarf and a pendant made of glass and amber beads were also discovered with the woman.

Old Swiss Confederacy

On 1 May 1351, the citizens of Zürich had to swear allegiance before representatives of the cantons of Lucerne, Schwyz, Uri and Unterwalden, the other members of the Swiss Confederacy. Thus, Zürich became the fifth member of the Confederacy, which was at that time a loose confederation of de facto independent states. Zürich was the presiding canton of the Diet from 1468 to 1519. This authority was the executive council and lawmaking body of the confederacy, from the Middle Ages until the establishment of the Swiss federal state in 1848. Zürich was temporarily expelled from the confederacy in 1440 due to a war with the other member states over the territory of Toggenburg (the Old Zürich War). Neither side had attained significant victory when peace was agreed upon in 1446, and Zürich was readmitted to the confederation in 1450.

He lived there from 1484 until his death in 1531. The Zürich Bible, based on that of Zwingli, was issued in 1531. The Reformation resulted in major changes in state matters and civil life in Zürich, spreading also to a number of other cantons. Several cantons remained Catholic and became the basis of serious conflicts that eventually led to the outbreak of the Wars of Kappel.

During the 16th and 17th centuries, the Council of Zürich adopted an isolationist attitude, resulting in a second ring of imposing fortifications built in 1624. The Thirty Years' War which raged across Europe motivated the city to build these walls. The fortifications required a lot of resources, which were taken from subject territories without reaching any agreement. The following revolts were crushed brutally. In 1648, Zürich proclaimed itself a republic, shedding its former status of a free imperial city. In this time the political system of Zürich was an oligarchy: the dominant families of the city were the following ones: Bonstetten, Brun, Bürkli, Escher vom Glas, Escher vom Luchs, Hirzel, Jori (or von Jori), Kilchsperger, Landenberg, Manesse, Meiss, Meyer von Knonau, Mülner, von Orelli.

Zürich lost control of the land and its economic privileges, and the city and the canton separated their possessions between 1803 and 1805. Most of the ramparts built in the 17th century were torn down, without ever having been besieged, to allay rural concerns over the city's hegemony. The Treaty of Zürich between Austria, France, and Sardinia was signed in 1859.

Modern history

Zürich was the Federal capital for 1839–40, and consequently, the victory of the Conservative party there in 1839 caused a great stir throughout Switzerland. But when in 1845 the Radicals regained power at Zürich, which was again the Federal capital for 1845–46, Zürich took the lead in opposing the Sonderbund cantons. Following the Sonderbund war and the formation of the Swiss Federal State, Zürich voted in favour of the Federal constitutions of 1848 and of 1874. The enormous immigration from the country districts into the town from the 1830s onwards created an industrial class which, though "settled" in the town, did not possess the privileges of burghership, and consequently had no share in the municipal government. First of all in 1860 the town schools, hitherto open to "settlers" only on paying high fees, were made accessible to all, next in 1875 ten years' residence ipso facto conferred the right of burghership, and in 1893 the eleven outlying districts were incorporated within the town proper.

When Jews also began to settle in Zürich following their equality in 1862, the Israelitische Cultusgemeinde Zürich was founded.

Extensive developments took place during the 19th century. Zürich's  (Station Street) was laid out in 1867, and the Zürich Stock Exchange was founded in 1877. Industrialisation led to migration into the cities and to rapid population growth, particularly in the suburbs of Zürich.

The  are an important milestone in the development of the modern city of Zürich, as the construction of the new lake front transformed Zürich from a small medieval town on the rivers Limmat and Sihl to an attractive modern city on the  shore, under the guidance of the city engineer Arnold Bürkli.

In 1893, the twelve outlying districts were incorporated into Zürich, including Aussersihl, the workman's quarter on the left bank of the Sihl, and additional land was reclaimed from Lake Zürich.

In 1934, eight additional districts in the north and west of Zürich were incorporated.

Zürich was accidentally bombed during World War II. As persecuted Jews sought refuge in Switzerland, the SIG (Israelite Community of Switzerland) raised financial resources. The central committee for refugee aid, created in 1933, was located in Zürich.

The canton of Zürich did not recognise the Jewish religious communities as legal entities (and therefore as equal to national churches) until 2005.

Coat of arms

The blue and white coat of arms of Zürich is attested from 1389 and was derived from banners with blue and white stripes in use since 1315. The first certain testimony of banners with the same design is from 1434. The coat of arms is flanked by two lions. The red  on top of the banner had varying interpretations: For the people of Zürich, it was a mark of honour, granted by Rudolph I. Zürich's neighbours mocked it as a sign of shame, commemorating the loss of the banner at Winterthur in 1292. Today, the Canton of Zürich uses the same coat of arms as the city.

Politics

City districts

The previous boundaries of the city of Zürich (before 1893) were more or less synonymous with the location of the old town. Two large expansions of the city limits occurred in 1893 and in 1934 when the city of Zürich merged with many surrounding municipalities, that had been growing increasingly together since the 19th century.
  lies along the west side of Lake Zürich, and contains the neighbourhoods of Enge, Wollishofen and Leimbach.
  is on the edge of the  hill as well as the Zürichberg, on the eastern side of the city. These neighbourhoods are home to Zürich's wealthiest and more prominent residents. The neighbourhood  also belongs to district 7.
 , officially called , but colloquially known as Seefeld, lies on the eastern side of Lake Zürich.

Most of the district boundaries are fairly similar to the original boundaries of the previously existing municipalities before they were incorporated into the city of Zürich.

Government

The City Council constitutes the executive government of the City of Zürich and operates as a collegiate authority. It is composed of nine councilors, each presiding over a department. Departmental tasks, coordination measures and implementation of laws decreed by the Municipal Council are carried out by the City Council. The regular election of the City Council by any inhabitant valid to vote is held every four years. The mayor is elected as such by a public election by a system of Majorz while the heads of the other departments are assigned by the collegiate. Any resident of Zurich allowed to vote can be elected as a member of the City Council. In the mandate period 2018–2022 (Legislatur) the City Council is presided by mayor Corine Mauch. The executive body holds its meetings in the City Hall, on the left bank of the Limmat. The building was built in 1883 in Renaissance style.

, the Zürich City Council was made up of three representatives of the SP (Social Democratic Party, one of whom is the mayor), two members each of the Green Party and the FDP (Free Democratic Party), and one member each of GLP (Green Liberal Party) and AL (Alternative Left Party), giving the left parties a combined six out of nine seats. The last regular election was held on 4 March 2018.

Claudia Cuche-Curti is Town Chronicler since 2012, and Peter Saile is Legal Counsel since 2000 for the City Council.

Parliament

The Municipal Council holds the legislative power. It is made up of 125 members, with elections held every four years. The Municipal Council decrees regulations and by-laws that are executed by the City Council and the administration. The sessions of the Municipal Council are held in public. Unlike those of the City Council, the members of the Municipal Council are not politicians by profession but are paid a fee based on their attendance. Any resident of Zürich allowed to vote can be elected as a member of the Municipal Council. The legislative body holds its meetings in the town hall, on the right bank of the Limmat opposite to the City Hall.

The last election of the Municipal Council was held on 4 March 2018 for the mandate period of 2018–2022. , the Municipal Council consist of 43 members of the Social Democratic Party (SP), 21 The Liberals (FDP), 17 members of the Swiss People's Party (SVP), 16 Green Party (GPS), 14 Green Liberal Party (GLP), 10 Alternative List (AL), and four members of the Evangelical People's Party (EVP), giving the left parties an absolute majority of 69.

Elections

National Council
In the 2019 federal election for the Swiss National Council the most popular party was the SPS which received 25.6% (-6) of the vote. The next four most popular parties were the GPS (20.9%, +9.7), GLP (15.7%, +6.4), SVP (13.7%, -4.3), the FDP (11.8%, -2.2), the AL (4%, new), and the CVP (3.5%, -0.2). In the federal election, a total of 110,760 voters were cast, and the voter turnout was 47.7%.

In the 2015 federal election for the Swiss National Council the most popular party was the SPS which received 31.6% of the vote. The next four most popular parties were the SVP (18%), the FDP (14%), the GPS (10.7%), the GLP (9.2%). In the federal election, a total of 114,377 voters were cast, and the voter turnout was 46.2%.

International relations

Twin towns and sister cities
Zürich is partnered with two sister cities: Kunming and San Francisco.

Geography

The Old Town stretches on both sides of the Limmat, which flows from the lake, running northwards at first and then gradually turning into a curve to the west. Today the incorporated city stretches somewhat beyond the natural confines of the hills and includes some districts to the northeast in the Glatt Valley and to the north in the Limmat Valley. The boundaries of the older city are easy to recognize by the Schanzengraben canal. This artificial watercourse has been used for the construction of the third fortress in the 17th and 18th centuries.

Topography
The area includes a section of the northern Swiss Plateau. The banks of the Limmat constitute the densest part of the city. The partially channeled and straightened Limmat does not flow in the central part of the valley, but always along its right (northeastern) side. The Sihl meets with the Limmat at the end of Platzspitz, which borders the Swiss National Museum.

On its west side, the Limmat valley is flanked by the wooded heights of the Albis chain, which runs along the western border. Its summit can be reached easily by the Uetlibergbahn. From the platform of the observation tower on the summit, an impressive panorama of the city, the lake, and the Alps can be seen.

The northeast side of the Limmat valley includes a range of hills, which marks the watershed between the Limmat and the Glatt. From the northwest to the southeast, the height of the mostly wooded knolls generally increases: the Gubrist, the Hönggerberg, the Käferberg, the Zürichberg, the Adlisberg and the Öschbrig. Between the Käferberg and the Zürichberg is located the saddle of the Milchbuck (about ), an important passage from the Limmat valley to the Glatt valley.

The northernmost part of the municipality extends to the plain of the Glatt valley and to the saddle which makes the connection between the Glattal and Furttal. Also, a part of the Katzensee (nature reserve) and the Büsisee, both of which are drained by the Katzenbach to Glatt, belong to the city.

Climate
Zürich has an oceanic climate (Köppen: Cfb), with warm summers and four distinct seasons. Decisive for the climate of Zürich are both the winds from westerly directions, which often result in precipitation and, on the other hand, the Bise (east or north-east wind), which is usually associated with high-pressure situations, but cooler weather phases with temperatures lower than the average. The Foehn wind, which plays an important role in the northern alpine valleys also has some impact on Zürich.

On average there are 74.9 days in which the minimum temperature is below  (so-called frost days), and 23.7 days in which the maximum temperature is below  (so-called ice days). There are on average 30 so-called summer days (maximum temperature equal to or above ) throughout the year, while so-called heat days (with maximum temperature equal to or above ) are 5.8 days.

Spring and autumn are generally cool to mild, but sometimes with large differences between warm and cold days even during the same year. The highest temperature of the month March in 2014 was on the 20th at  during a sunny afternoon and the lowest temperature was on the 25th at  during the night/early morning.

Zürich has an average of 1,544 hours of sunshine per year and shines on 38% of its potential time throughout the year. During the months April until September the sun shines between 150 and 215 hours per month. The  rainfall spread on 133.9 days with precipitation throughout the year. Roughly about every third day you will encounter at least some precipitation, which is very much a Swiss average. During the warmer half of the year and especially during the three summer months, the strength of rainfall is higher than those measured in winter, but the days with precipitation stays about the same throughout the year (in average 9.9–12.7 days per month). October has the lowest number (9.9) of days with some precipitation. There is an average of 59.5 so-called bright days (number of days with sunshine duration greater than 80%) through the year, the most in July and August (7.4, 7.7 days), and the least in January and December (2.7, 1.8 days). The average number of days with sunshine duration less than 20%, so-called cloudy days, is 158.4 days, while the most cloudy days are in November (17.8 days), December (21.7 days), and January with 19 days.

Climate protection
In November 2008 the people of Zürich voted in a public referendum to write into law the quantifiable and fixed deadline of one tonne of CO2 per person per annum by 2050. This forces any decision of the executive to support this goal, even if the costs are higher in all dimensions. Some examples are the new disinfection section of the public city hospital in Triemli (Minergie-P quality – passive house), the continued optimisation and creation of public transportation, enlargement of the bicycle-only network, research and projects for renewable energy and enclosure of speed-ways.

Urban area
The areas surrounding the Limmat are almost completely developed with residential, industrial, and commercial zones. The sunny and desirable residential areas in the hills overlooking Zürich, Waidberg and Zürichberg, and the bottom part of the slope on the western side of the valley on the Uetliberg, are also densely built.

The "green lungs" of the city include the vast forest areas of Adlisberg, Zürichberg, Käferberg, Hönggerberg and Uetliberg. Major parks are also located along the lakeshore (Zürichhorn and Enge), while smaller parks dot the city. Larger contiguous agricultural lands are located near Affoltern and Seebach. Of the total area of the municipality of Zürich (in 1996, without the lake), 45.4% is residential, industrial and commercial, 15.5% is transportation infrastructure, 26.5% is forest, 11%: is agriculture and 1.2% is water.

Transport

Public transport

Public transport is extremely popular in Zürich, and its inhabitants use public transport in large numbers. About 70% of the visitors to the city use the tram or bus, and about half of the journeys within the municipality take place on public transport. The ZVV network of public transport contains at least four means of mass-transit: any train that stops within the network's borders, in particular the S-Bahn (local trains), Zürich trams, and buses (both diesel and electric, also called trolley buses) and boats on the lake and river. In addition, the public transport network includes funicular railways and even the Luftseilbahn Adliswil-Felsenegg (LAF), a cable car between Adliswil and Felsenegg. Tickets purchased for a trip are valid on all means of public transportation (train, tram, bus, boat). The Zürichsee-Schifffahrtsgesellschaft (commonly abbreviated to ZSG) operates passenger vessels on the Limmat and the Lake Zürich, connecting surrounding towns between Zürich and Rapperswil.

Zürich is a mixed hub for railways, roads, and air traffic. Zürich Hauptbahnhof (Zürich HB) is the largest and busiest station in Switzerland and is an important railway hub in Europe. As of early 2020, Zürich HB served around 470,000 passengers and nearly 3,000 trains every day. Among the 16 railway stations (and 10 additional train stops) within Zürich's city borders, there are five other major passenger railway stations. Three of them belong to the ten most frequented railway stations in Switzerland: Stadelhofen, Oerlikon, Altstetten, Hardbrücke, and Enge. The railway network is mainly operated by the Swiss Federal Railways (SBB CFF FFS), but Zürich is also served by major EuroCity trains from the neighbouring countries and is a destination for both French/Swiss (TGV Lyria) and German (ICE) high-speed trains, as well as by Austrian RailJet.

Zurich Airport
Zurich Airport has its own railway station, which is located underground. It is directly connected to Zürich and most of the major Swiss cities. Zurich Airport is served by more than 60 passenger airlines from around the world. It is also served by one cargo airline and is a hub for Swiss International Air Lines. There is also an airfield in Dübendorf.

Road traffic
The A1, A3 and A4 motorways pass close to Zürich. The A1 heads west towards Bern and Geneva and eastwards towards St. Gallen; the A4 leads northwards to Schaffhausen and southwards to Altdorf connecting with the A2 towards Chiasso; and the A3 heads northwest towards Basel and southeast along Lake Zürich and Lake Walen towards Sargans.

Bicycle transport
In 2012, the city council launched a program to improve the city's attractiveness for bicycle traffic. The so-called "Masterplan Velo" is part of the superordinate framework Stadtverkehr 2025 which shapes the future of the different means of transport. Research revealed that infrastructure and the social environment are essential factors in improving a city's appeal to bicycle traffic. Three main goals are specified: First, the modal share of bicycle traffic should be enhanced to twice the value of 2011 by 2015. Second, cyclists' safety should be improved to lower the overall accident risk. Third, cycling should be established as an everyday means of transport with a special focus on children and young people.

In terms of infrastructure, the city aims to build up a network of distinctive bicycle routes in order to achieve these objectives. At a final stage, the network will consist of main routes (Hauptrouten) for everyday use and comfort routes (Komfortrouten), with the latter focusing on leisure cycling. Additional measures such as special Velostationen providing bike-related services are expected to help to further improve the quality. One of the key projects of the system is a tunnel beneath the tracks of the main railway station planned to combine a main connection with staffed possibilities where commuters can leave their bikes throughout the day. Apart from infrastructural measures, further approaches are planned in the fields of communication, education and administration.

However, these efforts cause critique, mainly due to postponing. The institution of the bike tunnel at the main railway station, originally planned for 2016, is currently (2016) delayed to at least 2019. Pro Velo, a nationwide interest group, has publicly questioned whether the masterplan already failed. The critique aims at badly governed traffic management at construction sites, missing possibilities to park bikes in the city as well as rather diffident ambitions. In response, the responsible city department points to the big investments made every year and mentions ongoing discussions that would finally lead to even better results.

Demographics

Population

There are  people living in Zürich (as of ), making it Switzerland's largest city. Of registered inhabitants (in 2016), 32% (133,473) do not hold Swiss citizenship. Of these, German citizens make up the largest group with 8% (33,548), followed by Italians 3.5% (14,543). As of 2011, the population of the city, including suburbs, totaled 1.17 million people. The entire metropolitan area (including the cities of Winterthur, Baden, Brugg, Schaffhausen, Frauenfeld, Uster / Wetzikon, Rapperswil-Jona, and Zug) had a population of around 1.82 million people.

Languages
The official formal language used by governmental institutions, print, news, schools and universities, courts, theatres and in any kind of written form is the Swiss variety of Standard German, while the spoken language is Zürich German (Züritüütsch), one of the several more or less distinguishable, but mutually intelligible Swiss German dialects of Switzerland with roots in the medieval Alemannic German dialect groups. However, because of Zürich's national importance, and therefore its existing high fluctuation, its inhabitants and commuters speak all kinds of Swiss German dialects. As of the December 2010 census, 69.3% of the population speaks diglossic Swiss German/Swiss Standard German as their mother-tongue at home. Some 22.7% of inhabitants speak Standard German in their family environment ("at home"). Dramatically increasing, according to the last census in 2000, 8.8% now speak English. Italian follows behind at 7.1% of the population, then French at 4.5%. Other languages spoken here include: Bosnian (4.1%), Spanish (3.9%), Portuguese (3.1%), and Albanian (2.3%). (Multiple choices were possible.) Thus, 20% of the population speak two or more languages at home.

Religion

Before the Protestant Reformation reached Zürich, it was de jure and de facto Roman Catholic.

The Protestant Reformation, led by Huldrych Zwingli, made Zürich both a theological centre and a stronghold of Protestantism in Switzerland. Another Swiss city with a comparable status was Geneva, the so-called Protestant Rome, where John Calvin and his Protestant Reformers operated, as well as Basel. Zürich attracted other influential Protestant Reformers like Heinrich Bullinger. Zwingli translated the Bible (Zürich Bible) into the local variety of German, and introduced the Reformation by winning support of the magistrates, the princess abbess Katharina von Zimmern, and the largely peasant population of the Canton of Zürich. The canton unanimously adopted the Reformed tradition, as represented by Zwingli. Religious wars between Catholics and Protestants tormented the Swiss Confederacy. Zwingli died for political and religious reasons by defending the Canton of Zürich in the Battle of Kappel. Bullinger took over his role as the city's spiritual leader.

In 1970, about 53% of the population were Swiss Reformed, while almost 40% were Roman Catholic. Since then, both large Swiss churches, the Roman Catholic Church and Swiss Reformed Church, have been constantly losing members, though for the Catholic Church, the decrease started 20 years later, in around 1990. Nevertheless, for the last twenty years, both confessions have been reduced by 10%, to the current figures (census 2010): 30% Roman Catholic, and 26% Swiss Reformed (organized in Evangelical Reformed Church of the Canton of Zürich). In 1970, only 2% of Zürich's inhabitants claimed to be not affiliated with any religious confession. In accordance with the loss by the large Swiss churches, the number of people declaring themselves as non-affiliated rose to 17% in the year 2000. In the last ten years, this figure rose to more than 25%. For the group of people, being between 24 and 44 years old, this is as high as one in every third person.

5% of Zürich's inhabitants are Muslims, a slight decrease of 1%, compared to the year 2000. The Mahmood Mosque Zürich, situated in Forchstrasse, is the first mosque built in Switzerland.

The population of Jewish ethnicity and religion has been more or less constant since 1970, at about 1%. The Synagoge Zürich Löwenstrasse is the oldest and largest synagogue of Zürich.

Social
The level of unemployment in Zürich was 3.2% in July 2012. In 2008, the average monthly income was about CHF 7000 before any deductions for social insurances and taxes. In 2010, there were 12,994 cases (on average per month) of direct or indirect welfare payments from the state.

Quality of living
Zürich often performs very well in international rankings, some of which are mentioned below:

Monocle's 2012 "Quality of Life Survey" ranked Zürich first on a list of the top 25 cities in the world "to make a base within". In 2019 Zürich was ranked among the ten most liveable cities in the world by Mercer together with Geneva and Basel.
In fDi Magazines "Global Cities of the Future 2021/22" report, Zürich placed 16th in the overall rankings (all categories). In the category "Mid-sized and small cities", Zürich was 2nd overall, behind Wroclaw, having also placed 2nd in the subcategory "Human capital and lifestyle" and 3rd under "Business friendliness". In the category "FDI strategy, overall" (relating to foreign direct investment), Zürich ranked 9th, behind such cities as New York, Montreal (1st and 2nd) and Dubai (at number 8).

Main sites

Most of Zürich's sites are located within the area on either side of the Limmat, between the Main railway station and Lake Zürich. The churches and houses of the old town are clustered here, as are the most expensive shops along the famous Bahnhofstrasse. The Lindenhof in the old town is the historical site of the Roman castle, and the later Carolingian Imperial Palace.

Churches
Grossmünster (Great Minster) According to legend, Charlemagne discovered the graves of the city's martyrs Felix and Regula and had built the first church as a monastery; start of current building around 1100; in the first half of the 16th century, the Great Minster was the starting point of the Swiss-German Reformation led by Huldrych Zwingli and Heinrich Bullinger; declared by Charlemagne imperial church; romanesque crypt, romanesque capitals in the church and cloister; choir windows by Augusto Giacometti (1932) and Sigmar Polke (2009), bronze doors by Otto Münch (1935 and 1950).
Fraumünster (Women's Minster) Church of a former abbey for aristocratical women from southern Germany which was founded in 853 by Louis the German for his daughter Hildegard; first church built before 874; the romanesque choir dates from 1250 to 1270; the church enjoyed the patronage of kings and had the right of coinage from Zürich to the 13th century; after the Reformation, church and convent passed into the possession of the city; the most important jewelry – in addition to the largest organ in the canton with its 5,793 pipes and 92 stops – are color windows: the window in the north transept of Augusto Giacometti (1945), the five-part cycle in the choir (1970) and the rosette in the southern transept (1978) are by Marc Chagall; also the church of Zürich's largest choir with 100 and more singers.
Predigerkirche is one of the four main churches of the old town, first built in 1231 AD as a Romanesque church of the then Dominican Predigerkloster nearby the Neumarkt. It was converted in the first half of the 14th century, and the choir rebuilt between 1308 and 1350. Due to its construction and for that time unusual high bell tower, it was regarded as the most high Gothic edifice in Zürich.

Museums
Zürich Museum of Art – The Museum of Art, also known as Kunsthaus Zürich, is one of the significant art museums of Europe. It holds one of the largest collections in Classic Modern art in the world (Munch, Picasso, Braque, Giacometti, etc.). The museum also features a large library collection of photographs.
Swiss National Museum – The National Museum (German: Landesmuseum) displays many objects that illustrate the cultural and historical background of Switzerland. It also contains many ancient artifacts, including stained glass, costumes, painted furniture and weapons. The museum is located in the Platzspitz park opposite to the Hauptbahnhof.
Centre Le Corbusier – Located on the shore of the Lake Zürich nearby Zürichhorn, the Centre Le Corbusier (also named: Heidi Weber Museum), is an art museum dedicated to the work of the Swiss architect Le Corbusier, inside the last house he designed.
Rietberg Museum – The Rietberg Museum, situated in Gablerstrasse, is one of the great repositories of art and culture in Zürich. The museum also displays exhibits gathered from various corners of the world: bronze artifacts from Tibet, ceramics and jade, Indian sculpture, Chinese grave decorations, masks by African tribes, etc.
Museum of Design – The Museum of Design is a museum for industrial design, visual communication, architecture and craft. It is part of the Department of Cultural Analysis of the Zürich University of the Arts.
Haus Konstruktiv – The Haus Konstruktiv is a museum with Swiss-wide and international recognition. The museum is about constructive, concrete and conceptual art and design. It testimonies to Zürich's industrial architecture in the immediate vicinity of the Main Station.
Uhrenmuseum Beyer – The Uhrenmuseum is located in the heart of the city. Documenting the history of timekeeping and timekeepers, the museum is home to a large collection of mechanical timepieces as well as a collection of primitive time keeping devices such as water clocks, sundials and hourglasses
No Show Museum – the No Show Museum is the first museum dedicated to nothing and its various manifestations throughout the history of art.
Guild houses – The Guild houses (German: Zunfthaus) are located along the Limmat (downstream from the Grossmünster): Meisen (also a porcelain and faience museum), Rüden, Haue, Saffran, Schneidern, Schmiden, Zimmerleuten, and some more.
Tram Museum – The Tram Museum is located at Burgwies in Zürich's eastern suburbs, and chronicles the history of Zürich's iconic tram system with exhibits varying in date from 1897 to the present day.
North America Native Museum – The North American Native Museum specializes in the conservation, documentation and presentation of ethnographic objects and art of Native American, First Nation and Inuit cultures.
FIFA Museum - The museum exhibits memorabilities from the world of Association Football (Soccer), founded by the Féderation Internationale de Football Association

Parks and nature
Zoological Garden – The zoological garden holds about 260 species of animals and houses about 2200 animals. One can come across separate enclosures of snow leopards, India lions, clouded leopards, Amur leopards, otters and pandas in the zoo.
Botanical Garden – The Botanical Garden houses about 15,000 species of plants and trees and contains as many as three million plants. In the garden, many rare plant species from south western part of Africa, as well as from New Caledonia can be found. The University of Zürich holds the ownership of the Botanical Garden.
Chinese Garden – The Chinese Garden is a gift by Zürich's Chinese partner town Kunming, as remiscence for Zürich's technical and scientific assistance in the development of the Kunming city drinking water supply and drainage. The garden is an expression of one of the main themes of Chinese culture, the «Three Friends of Winter» – three plants that together brave the cold season – pine, bamboo, and plum.
The summit is easily accessible by train from Zürich main station.

Kunst und Bau (construction permit office) 

In 1922 Augusto Giacometti won the competition to paint the entrance hall of Amtshaus I, which the city promised to brighten up this gloomy room, which was once used as a cellar, and at the same time to alleviate the precarious economic situation of the local artists. Giacometti brought in the painters Jakob Gubler, Giuseppe Scartezzini and Franz Riklin for the execution of this fresco, which encompasses the ceiling and walls, thereby creating a unique color space that appears almost sacred in its luminosity.

Architecture

Compared to other cities, there are few tall buildings in Zürich. The municipal building regulations (Article 9) limit the construction of high-rise buildings to areas in the west and north of the city. Around the year 2000, regulations became more flexible and high-rise buildings were again planned and built. The people's initiative " is enough," which would have reduced both the maximum height and the high-rise buildings area, was clearly rejected on 29 November 2009. At this time in Zürich about a dozen high-rise buildings were under construction or in planning, including the Prime Tower as the tallest skyscraper in Switzerland at the time of its construction. There are numerous examples of brutalist buildings throughout the city, including the Swissmill Tower which, at 118m, is the world's tallest grain silo.

World heritage sites
The prehistoric settlements at Enge Alpenquai and Grosser Hafner and Kleiner Hafner are part of the Prehistoric Pile dwellings around the Alps a UNESCO World Heritage Site.

Economy

In a 2009 survey by CityMayors.com, Zürich was ranked 9th among the "World's 10 Most Powerful Cities". In the 2017 Global Financial Centres Index, Zürich was ranked as having the 11th most competitive financial center in the world, and second most competitive in Europe after London. The Greater Zürich Area is Switzerland's economic centre and home to many international companies. By far the most important sector in the economy of Zürich is the service industry, which employs nearly four-fifths of workers. Other important industries include light industry, machine and textile industries and tourism. Located in Zürich, the Swiss Stock Exchange was established in 1877 and is now the fourth most prominent stock exchange in the world. In addition, Zürich is the world's largest gold trading centre.

Ten of the country's 50 largest companies have their head offices in Zürich, among them ABB, UBS, Credit Suisse, Swiss Re and Zürich Financial Services. Most Swiss banks have their headquarters in Zürich and there are numerous foreign banks in the Greater Zürich Area. "Gnomes of Zürich" is a colloquial term used for Swiss bankers  on account of their alleged secrecy and speculative dealing.

Contributory factors to economic strength
The high quality of life has been cited as a reason for economic growth in Zürich. The consulting firm Mercer has for many years ranked Zürich as a city with the highest quality of life in the world. In particular, Zürich received high scores for work, housing, leisure, education and safety. Local planning authorities ensure clear separation between urban and recreational areas and there are many protected nature reserves. Zürich is also ranked the third most expensive city in the world, behind Hong Kong and Tokyo and ahead of Singapore.

Zürich benefits from the high level of investment in education which is typical of Switzerland in general and provides skilled labour at all levels. The city is home to two major universities, thus enabling access to graduates and high technology research. Professional training incorporates a mix of practical work experience and academic study while, in general, emphasis is placed on obtaining a good level of general education and language ability. As a result, the city is home to many multilingual people and employees generally demonstrate a high degree of motivation and a low level of absenteeism. The employment laws are less restrictive as nearby Germany or France. Technology new start, FinTech and others in MedTech secure good seed and starter funding.

The Swiss stock exchange
The Swiss stock exchange is called SIX Swiss Exchange, formerly known as SWX. The SIX Swiss Exchange is the head group of several different worldwide operative financial systems: Eurex, Eurex US, EXFEED, STOXX, and virt-x. The exchange turnover generated at the SWX was in 2007 of 1,780,499.5 million CHF; the number of transactions arrived in the same period at 35,339,296 and the Swiss Performance Index (SPI) arrived at a total market capitalization of 1,359,976.2 million CHF.

Education and research

About 70,000 people study at the 20 universities, colleges and institutions of higher education in Zürich in 2019. Two of Switzerland's most distinguished universities are located in the city: the Swiss Federal Institute of Technology (ETH Zurich), which is controlled by the federal government, and the University of Zurich, under direction of the canton of Zürich. Both universities were listed in the top 50 world universities rated in 2007, while the ETH has consistently remained in the top 10 universities worldwide since 2016.

ETH was founded in 1854 by the Swiss Confederation and opened its doors in 1855 as a polytechnic institute. ETH achieved its reputation particularly in the fields of chemistry, mathematics and physics and there are 21 Nobel Laureates who are associated with the institution. ETH is usually ranked the top university in continental Europe. The institution consists of two campuses, the main building in the heart of the city and the new campus on the outskirts of the city.

The University of Zurich was founded in 1833, although its beginnings date back to 1525 when the Swiss reformer Ulrich Zwingli founded a college of theology. Nowadays with its 24,000 students and 1,900 graduations each year, the University of Zürich is the largest in Switzerland and offers the widest range of subjects and courses at any Swiss higher education institution.

The Pedagogical College, the Zurich University of Applied Sciences (ZHAW) and the Zurich University of the Arts (ZHdK) are another three top-class technical colleges which contribute to Zürich's reputation as a knowledge and research pole by providing applied research and development. Zürich is also one of the co-location centres of the Knowledge and Innovation Community (Climate Change Mitigation and Adaptation) of the European Institute of Innovation and Technology.

In addition to the university libraries, the city is also served by the Zentralbibliothek Zürich, a research and public library, and the Pestalozzi-Bibliothek Zürich, a public library with 14 locations.

State universities by size in canton of Zürich

Media
Many large Swiss media conglomerates are headquartered in Zürich, such as tamedia, Ringier and the NZZ-Verlag.

Television and radio

The headquarters of Switzerland's national licence fee-funded German language television network ("SF") are located in the Leutschenbach neighborhood, to the north of the Oerlikon railway station. Regional commercial television station "TeleZüri" (Zürich Television) has its headquarters near Escher-Wyss Platz. The production facilities for other commercial stations "Star TV", "u1" TV and "3+" are located in Schlieren.

One section of the Swiss German language licence fee-funded public radio station "Schweizer Radio DRS" is located in Zürich. There are commercial local radio stations broadcasting from Zürich, such as "Radio 24" on the Limmatstrasse, "Energy Zürich" in Seefeld on the Kreuzstrasse, Radio "LoRa" and "Radio 1". There are other radio stations that operate only during certain parts of the year, such as "CSD Radio" (May/June), "Radio Streetparade" (July/August) and "rundfunk.fm" (August/September).

Print media
There are three large daily newspapers published in Zürich that are known across Switzerland. The Neue Zürcher Zeitung (NZZ), the Tages-Anzeiger and Blick, the largest Swiss tabloid. All three of those newspapers publish Sunday editions. These are the NZZ am Sonntag, SonntagsZeitung and SonntagsBlick. Besides the three main daily newspapers, there is a free daily commuter newspaper which is widely distributed: 20 Minuten (20 minutes), published weekdays in the mornings.

A number of magazines from major publishers are based in Zürich. Some examples are Bilanz, Die Weltwoche, Annabelle, Schweizer Familie and Schweizer Illustrierte.

Culture

In addition to high-quality museums and galleries, Zürich has high-calibre chamber and symphony orchestras and several important theatres.

The Zurich Film Festival is an international film festival, lasting 11 days and featuring popular international productions.

One of the largest and most popular annual events in Zürich is the Street Parade, which is also one of the largest techno and dance music festivals in the world. Proceeding along the side of Lake Zürich, it is normally held on the second Saturday in August. The first edition was held in 1992 with about 1,000 participants. By 2001 the event attracted one million participants. The Zürifäscht, on the other hand, is a triennial public festival. It features music, fireworks set to music, and other attractions throughout the old town. It is the largest public festival in Switzerland and attracts up to 2 million visitors.

The Kunst Zürich is an international contemporary art fair with an annual guest city; it combines most recent arts with the works of well-established artists. Another annual public art exhibit is the city campaign, sponsored by the City Vereinigung (the local equivalent of a chamber of commerce) with the cooperation of the city government. It consists of decorated sculptures distributed over the city centre, in public places. Past themes have included lions (1986), cows (1998), benches (2003), teddy bears (2005), and huge flower pots (2009). From this originated the concept of the CowParade that has been featured in other major world cities.

Zürich has been the home to several art movements. The Dada movement was founded in 1916 at the Cabaret Voltaire. Artists like Max Bill, Marcel Breuer, Camille Graeser or Richard Paul Lohse had their ateliers in Zürich, which became even more important after the takeover of power by the Nazi regime in Germany and World War II.

The best known traditional holiday in Zürich is the Sechseläuten (Sächsilüüte), including a parade of the guilds and the burning of "winter" in effigy at the Sechseläutenplatz. During this festival the popular march known as the Sechseläutenmarsch is played. It has no known composer but likely originated in Russia. Another is the Knabenschiessen target shooting competition for teenagers (originally boys, open to female participants since 1991).

Opera, ballet, and theaters

The Zürich Opera House (German: Zürcher Opernhaus), built in 1834, was the first permanent theatre in the heart of Zürich and was at the time, the main seat of Richard Wagner's activities. Later in 1890, the theatre was re-built as an ornate building with a neo-classical architecture. The portico is made of white and grey stone ornamented with the busts of Wagner, Weber and Mozart. Later, busts of Schiller, Shakespeare and Goethe were also added. The auditorium is designed in the rococo style. Once a year, it hosts the Zürcher Opernball with the President of the Swiss Confederation and the economic and cultural élite of Switzerland. The Ballet Zürich performs at the opera house. The Zürich Opera Ball, a major social event, is held annually at the Opera House as a fundraiser for the opera and ballet companies.

The Schauspielhaus Zürich is the main theatre complex of the city. It has two dépendances: Pfauen in the Central City District and Schiffbauhalle, an old industrial hall, in Zürich West. The Schauspielhaus was home to emigrants such as Bertolt Brecht or Thomas Mann, and saw premieres of works of Max Frisch, Friedrich Dürrenmatt, Botho Strauss or Elfriede Jelinek. The Schauspielhaus is one of the most prominent and important theatres in Switzerland.

The Theater am Neumarkt is one of the oldest theatres of the city. Established by the old guilds in the Old City District, it is located in a baroque palace near Niederdorf Street. It has two stages staging mostly avantgarde works by European directors.

The Zürcher Theater Spektakel is an international theatre festival, featuring contemporary performing arts.

Food
The traditional cuisine of Zürich reflects the centuries of rule by patrician burghers as well as the lasting imprint of Huldrych Zwingli's puritanism. Traditional dishes include Zürcher Geschnetzeltes and Tirggel.

Nightlife and clubbing

Zürich is host city of the Street Parade, which takes place in August every year (see above).

The most famous districts for Nightlife are the Niederdorf in the old town with bars, restaurants, lounges, hotels, clubs, etc. and a lot of fashion shops for a young and stylish public and the Langstrasse in the districts 4 and 5 of the city. There are authentic amusements: bars, punk clubs, hip hop stages, Caribbean restaurants, arthouse cinemas, Turkish kebabs and Italian espresso-bars, but also sex shops or the famous red-light district of Zürich.

In the past ten years new parts of the city have risen into the spotlight.

Sports

Zürich is home to several international sport federations. The Fédération Internationale de Football Association (FIFA) is headquartered in the city. In 2007 were inaugurated the new FIFA headquarters building, designed by architect Tilla Theus.

Association football is an essential aspect of sports in Zürich. The city is home to two major Swiss football teams; Grasshopper Club Zürich founded in 1886 and FC Zürich founded in 1896, both competing in Switzerland's highest league.

Among the most popular sports in Switzerland is ice hockey. In Zürich it is represented by the ZSC Lions. The International Ice Hockey Federation (IIHF) officiating as head organisation for ice hockey leagues worldwide is based in Zürich as well.

Cycling is a popular sport as well as a means of transport in Zürich. Cycling routes are generally marked with red and white signs and the yellow lanes are exclusively meant for cyclists. Also hiking trails are well marked with yellow signs, which give the hiker the probable time it will take them to reach their destination. There are specific maps available for hiking and walking trails throughout Switzerland. Some of the most accessible walks in the Zürich area are the Uetliberg and the Zürichberg. The Offene Rennbahn otherwise known as the Oerlikon Velodrome deserves a special visit on any Tuesday evening in the summer, for cyclists there are chances to see time trial champions or local Swiss national cyclists challenging other amateurs in a variety of races including Madison or Keirin events.

As many as 30 clubs and seven indoor curling facilities can be found in the greater Zürich area. The curling season starts in early September and continues until the end of April.

Zürich is Switzerland's hub for Lacrosse. The Zürich Lions Lacrosse Academics, who play their home games at the Hochschulsportanlage Fluntern, have been the country's dominant team and a major competitor at international events.

Events

Weltklasse Zürich, sometimes referred to as the one-day Olympics, is a one-day athletics meet held annually at the Letzigrund Stadium. Since it started on 12 August 1928, the sporting event has witnessed new world records and national records. To date as many as 24 world records were set in Weltklasse.

Zürich Marathon is a popular sport event, inviting numerous athletes from every corner of the globe. Zürich Marathon is a long-distance running event, covering  at one stretch. The running course starts in Zürich and passes through Bahnhofstrasse, Bellevueplatz, Mythenquai, Quaibrücke, Talstrasse and Utoquai, and along Lake Zürich to several other places. New Year's Eve run is another important running event. The race is held on 1 January each year and the start takes place at midnight exactly.

Zürich was one of six venues of the 1954 FIFA World Cup and one of eight venues of the UEFA Euro 2008. The Euro 2008 games were held in the Letzigrund Stadium. Work on the new Letzigrund was completed in exceptionally quick time and the stadium opened in August 2007 just one year after the demolition of the old arena.

Zürich hosted the UCI Track Cycling World Championships six times at the Oerlikon Velodrome. The first time was in 1929 and the last time in 1983.

Since 2013, the international Openair Literatur Festival Zürich takes place annually in Zurich, presented by Literaturhaus Zürich and Kaufleuten.

Zürich also hosted the 1998 World Ice Hockey Championships. The city previously co-hosted the 1953 and 1939 editions.

Zürich was also host to the 2012 Men's World Floorball Championships. This was the first time the event had been held in Zürich.

Notable people

Other points of interest

 The Schwamendingen X: level crossing of tram tracks, necessary because the tunnel uses island platforms for boarding (between trams, whose doors are on the right) while normally (outside the tunnel), passengers board to the outside (opposite the boarding area of oncoming trams). Trams normally travel on the right track, but in the tunnel they travel on the left.
 The Sihlfeld cemetery has a vending machine for funeral cards and other mourning supplies.
 The "Oepfelchammer" tavern in Zürich's Old Town offers an unusual athletic drinking game called : the drinker has to pull themselves up on a ceiling beam, cross over to the next beam, then drink a glass of wine with their head hanging down.

Further reading

Architecture
 Hönig, Roderick: Zürich wird gebaut. Architekturführer Zürich 1990–2010. Hochparterre, Zürich 2010, .
 Oechslin, Werner: Hochschulstadt Zürich. Bauten der ETH 1855–2005. GTA, Zürich 2005, .
 Bonte, Alexander, Bürkle, J. Christoph: Max Dudler Die neue Dichte – Der neue Stadtteil Europaallee und die Pädagogische Hochschule Zürich, Jovis, Berlin 2012,

Culture
 Kröger, Ute: Zürich, du mein blaues Wunder. Literarische Streifzüge durch eine europäische Kulturstadt. Limmat, Zürich 2004, .
 Staub, Ueli: Jazzstadt Zürich. Von Louis Armstrong bis Zürich Jazz Orchestra. Neue Zürcher Zeitung, Zürich 2003, .

Others
 Foppa, Daniel: Berühmte und vergessene Tote auf Zürichs Friedhöfen. Limmat, Zürich 2003, .
 Hegi, Christof u. a.: Zürich. Mairs, Ostfildern 2006,  (= Marco Polo Reiseführer).
 Heimgartner, Susanna: Zürich komplett. Regenbogen, Zürich 2005,  (= Regenbogen Reiseführer).
 Smith, Duncan J. D.: Nur in Zürich – Ein Reiseführer zu einzigartigen Orten, geheimen Plätzen und ungewöhnlichen Sehenswürdigkeiten (übersetzt von Walter Goidinger), Brandstätter, Wien 2012, .

See also

Switzerland
Bern
List of mayors of Zürich
PS Stadt Zürich

Notes and references

Notes

References

External links

Stadt Zürich – official website 
City of Zürich – official website 
Zürich Tourism – official website
Zürich Chamber of Commerce – official website
Event & Pleasure Calendar by Tages-Anzeiger (newspaper) 
NYT Travel Guide by The New York Times

 
Cantonal capitals of Switzerland
Municipalities of the canton of Zürich
Cities in Switzerland
Populated places on Lake Zurich
2nd-century establishments
Populated places established in the 2nd century
1210s establishments in the Holy Roman Empire
1218 establishments in Europe
1350s disestablishments in the Holy Roman Empire
1351 disestablishments in Europe
14th-century establishments in the Old Swiss Confederacy
1350s establishments in the Holy Roman Empire
1351 establishments in Europe
15th-century disestablishments in the Old Swiss Confederacy
1440s disestablishments in the Holy Roman Empire
1440 disestablishments in Europe
15th-century establishments in the Old Swiss Confederacy
1450s establishments in the Holy Roman Empire
1450 establishments in Europe